Patrik Leitner (born 7 February 2002) is a Slovak professional footballer who currently plays for Fortuna Liga club MŠK Žilina as a defender.

Club career

MŠK Žilina
Leitner made his Fortuna Liga debut for Žilina during a home fixture against FC ViOn Zlaté Moravce on 22 May 2021. He came on in the second half to replace Miroslav Gono in a 5-1 win for Žilina. 

He scored his first goal in a 2-1 cup win against Komárno on his first start for the club.

International career
In December 2022, Leitner was nominated by Francesco Calzona, who joined the side in late summer, for senior Slovak national team prospective players' training camp at NTC Senec.

References

External links
 MŠK Žilina official club profile 
 
 Futbalnet profile 
 

2002 births
Living people
Sportspeople from Žilina
Slovak footballers
Slovakia youth international footballers
Association football defenders
MŠK Žilina players
2. Liga (Slovakia) players
Slovak Super Liga players